Olav Iversen (born September 23, 1977, in Sandøy, Møre og Romsdal) is a Norwegian heavy metal singer-songwriter and musician. He is better known as a founding member and the guitarist, lead vocalist, and primary songwriter of the rock band Sahg, as well as its only constant member.

Musical career 
Iversen's remarkable career began with Trucks, a British/Norwegian pop punk band, whose most popular release was the 2002 novelty single, "It's Just Porn Mum". The single was a Top 5 hit in Norway, and peaked at No. 35 in the UK Singles Chart.

He's best known for being the only constant member and co-founder of the hard rock band Sahg in 2004, along with Tom Cato Visnes (King ov Hell), Einar Selvik (Kvitrafn) and Thomas Tofthagen.

Iversen has also been an active member in several bands in his country, as Audrey Horne and Manngard.

Apart from his musical projects, he has also worked as an art director and graphic designer in Bergen since 2000.

Discography

With Starling 
 Mellowcold (EP, 2001)

With Trucks 
 Juice (2003)

With Manngard 
  Circling Buzzards  (2006)	
 European Cowards (2007)

With Sahg 
 Sahg I (2006)
 Sahg II (2008)
 Sahg III (2010)
 Delusions Of Grandeur (2013)
 Memento Mori (2016)
Born Demon (2022)

As guest musician

With Audrey Horne 
Le Fol (2007)

With Vulture Industries 
The Malefactor's Bloody Register (2010)

With Dominanz 
Noxious (2014)

With Ahab 
The Boats of the "Glen Carrig" (2015)

References

External links 
Professional profile at Cargo Collective (in Norwegian)
Metallum Archvies
Discogs.com
YouTube Channel

1977 births
Norwegian heavy metal singers
Living people
Norwegian guitarists
Norwegian singer-songwriters
People from Sandøy
Sahg members
21st-century Norwegian singers
21st-century Norwegian guitarists
21st-century Norwegian male singers